Georgi Ivanov (born November 11, 1989) is a Bulgarian freestyle wrestler. He competed in the men's freestyle 74 kg event at the 2016 Summer Olympics, in which he was eliminated in the round of 16 by Jakob Makarashvili.

References

External links 

 Georgi Ivanov's Rokfin Channel

1989 births
Living people
Bulgarian male sport wrestlers
Olympic wrestlers of Bulgaria
Wrestlers at the 2016 Summer Olympics